Homoeosoma inornatellum is a species of snout moth in the genus Homoeosoma. It was described by George Duryea Hulst in 1900. It is found in North America, including New Jersey and Pennsylvania.

References

Moths described in 1900
Phycitini